Elizabeth Donald (born 1975) is an American author and journalist, best known for writing horror and science fiction, including the Nocturnal Urges vampire mystery series and Blackfire zombie series.

Life and career
Elizabeth Donald was born in Merced, California in 1975, the older of two children to Dr. Ralph Donald, a professor of mass communications retired from SIUE, and Patrice Stribling Nelson, a classical pianist. Donald attended Bryn Mawr School in Baltimore, Maryland and then Westview High School in Martin, Tennessee, graduating in 1993. She next attended the University of Memphis, initially studying theater, and then transferred to the University of Tennessee at Martin to study journalism, graduating with a bachelor's degree in mass communications.

Her first novel, Nocturnal Urges, was published in 2004, launching the three-book vampire series. Since then, she has published many novels and novellas, as well as a number of short story publications in various magazines. She has won the Darrell Award for horror and science fiction three times and has been a finalist for other awards, including the Prism Award from Romance Writers of America. She regularly appears at horror- and science fiction-themed conventions such as Archon, Dragoncon, MidSouthCon and Hypericon. In 2009, her novella titled "The Cold Ones" (Sam's Dot Publishing) sold out its first print run in 48 hours and launched the Blackfire series of novels and short stories. The protagonist of this novella was named after fellow author Sara M. Harvey.

She works as a freelance editor and writing coach, editing anthologies and novels for small-press publishers and working with beginning writers on fiction projects. In 2014, she launched a photography site, selling nature and art photography that has been licensed for book covers and other commercial purposes and has been featured in art shows and journals.

Elizabeth Donald was a reporter at the Belleville News-Democrat newspaper in Illinois from 2000 until 2018. She has won multiple journalism awards, including the Southern Illinois Editorial Association and Illinois Press Association awards. She was vice president of the St. Louis Society of Professional Journalists for three years, and elected chapter president in 2015, and continues to serve. She has been a member of the national SPJ ethics commission since 2009, and was part of the team that rewrote the organization's code of ethics in 2014. In 2010, she was one of two initial recipients of the Terry Harper Memorial Fellowship from the national Society of Professional Journalists. She is a contributor to journalism trade magazines and guest lecturer on the subjects of journalism ethics and the changing nature of journalism in the 21st century.

Currently she is a teaching assistant at Southern Illinois University Edwardsville, pursuing a master's degree in media studies and M.F.A. in creative writing, teaching newswriting and English.

Her uncle, Michael Stribling, is a new-age musician. She is married to author Jim Gillentine and has one son from a previous marriage. She is a lifelong member of the Episcopal church and resides in Edwardsville, Illinois.

Works
 Nocturnal Urges, 2004, novel, Ellora's Cave Publishing
 Winner of the 2005 Darrell Award
 Finalist for the 2004 Prism Award
 Rereleased in 2005 by Cerridwen Press
 A More Perfect Union, 2005, novel, Ellora's Cave Publishing
 Finalist for the 2006 Darrell Award
 Rereleased in 2005 by Cerridwen Press
 Setting Suns, 2006, anthology, New Babel Books
 
 Winner of the 2007 Darrell Award for the story, "Wonderland"
 Tandem, 2006, ebook, Ellora's Cave Publishing
 Also appears in "Sultry Summer Fun," a print anthology published in May 2007
 Nocturne, 2006 Cerridwen Press (this is a compilation of Nocturnal Urges and A More Perfect Union)
 
 Abaddon, 2007, novel, Cerridwen Press
  (ebook)
  (2008 paperback)
 Winner of the 2008 Darrell Award
 "Bargaining With Spiders," 2007, short story, appeared in the anthology Twilight and Thorns by Circle Dark Publishing.
 "Weathergirl," May 2009, short story, appearing in the anthology Cover of Darkness by Sam's Dot Publishing.
 The Dreadmire Chronicles, 2009, Spellbinder Books
 The Cold Ones, 2009, Sam's Dot Publishing
 Blackfire, 2011, Sam's Dot Publishing
 Infinity, 2011 novella, Aardvark Productions
 Dreadmire, 2013 novel, Inkstained Succubus Press
 Gethsemane, 2014 novella, Aardvark Productions
 Nocturne Infernum, 2015 compendium of three novels, Seventh Star Press
 
 Moonlight Sonata, 2017 collection, Dark Oak Press
 
 Finalist for Imadjinn Awards, 2018 
 "In Memoriam," October 2019, short story, appearing in the anthology Stories We Tell After Midnight by Crone Girls Press
 "Dear Katrina" and "Sergeant Curious", March 2020, short stories, appearing in literary magazine River Bluff Review.
 "Shiny People," March 2020, short story, appearing in the anthology Coppice and Brake by Crone Girls Press.
 Yanaguana, October 2020, novella, appearing in the collection Foul Womb of Night by Crone Girls Press.

References

External links
 

1975 births
Living people
American Episcopalians
21st-century American novelists
University of Tennessee at Martin alumni
People from Merced, California
American horror novelists
American science fiction writers
American women novelists
21st-century American women writers
Women science fiction and fantasy writers
Novelists from California
Bryn Mawr School people